Carl William Moran (born September 26, 1950) is an American politician and retired professional baseball pitcher.

Born in Portsmouth, Virginia, he attended Woodrow Wilson High School, Louisburg College, and Jacksonville University. Drafted by the Boston Red Sox in the ninth round of the 1971 Major League Baseball Draft, Moran played one year in the Major Leagues, going 1–3 with a 4.66 ERA for the Chicago White Sox during the  season. He appeared in 15 MLB games pitched, five as a starter, and allowed 57 hits and 23 bases on balls in 46⅓ innings pitched. He defeated the Oakland Athletics (headed for their third consecutive World Series championship that season) 3–2 on May 18 at Comiskey Park for his only MLB victory, starting the contest and allowing two earned runs in five innings. Terry Forster earned the save with four innings of shutout relief. Moran's minor league pitching career lasted for nine seasons (1971–1979), and he later worked as a scout for the White Sox.

In 2010, he ran for mayor of Portsmouth in a special election to replace recalled mayor James W. Holley III.

References

External links
, or Retrosheet, or Pelota Binaria (Venezuelan Winter League)

1950 births
Living people
Águilas del Zulia players
Alacranes de Durango players
American expatriate baseball players in Mexico
Baseball players from Virginia
Cardenales de Lara players
Chicago White Sox players
Denver Bears players
Dorados de Chihuahua players
Greenville Red Sox players
Iowa Oaks players
Jacksonville Dolphins baseball players
Knoxville Sox players
Louisburg Hurricanes baseball players
Major League Baseball pitchers
Mexican League baseball pitchers
Navegantes del Magallanes players
American expatriate baseball players in Venezuela
Sportspeople from Portsmouth, Virginia
Tigres del México players
Politicians from Portsmouth, Virginia
Winston-Salem Red Sox players
Winter Haven Red Sox players
Woodrow Wilson High School (Portsmouth, Virginia) alumni